The Beezley Hills are a range of hills, about  north of Quincy in Grant County, Washington with a maximum elevation of  or .

The city of Ephrata, Washington, at the east end of the hills, was originally called Beezley Springs, named after horse rancher Frank Beezley.

Geography
The hills rise from the east bank of the Columbia River between Moses Coulee and Frenchman Gap. The next member of the fold belt is the roughly parallel Frenchman Hills to the south.

Several springs occur on the lower slopes of the hills. In addition to Ephrata, formerly Beezley Springs (also spelled Beasley Springs), there are Baird Springs, Two Springs, and Willow Springs. The Grant County courthouse in Ephrata is geothermally heated from a hot spring.

The high point of Grant County is a  summit unofficially named , four miles north of Monument Hill and across Lynch Coulee from Monument Hill.

Beezley Hills formed the northern barrier to the ice age Missoula Floods that poured out through Quincy Basin and over Babcock Ridge to reach the sea.

Recreation areas and preserves
The Beezley Hills Recreation Area (near Ephrata, Washington) has  of trails and opened in 2012. The Beezley Burn is an annual cross-country mountain bike competition that ran there for the eighth year in 2014. It starts and ends in Ephrata, with a course that extends about  up into the east end of the Beezley Hills.

An earlier footrace in 2000 was also called the Beezley Burn and followed a similar course.

The   is part of a larger,   Moses Coulee/Beezley Hills Nature Conservancy preserve. They are all part of a  functional shrub-steppe ecoregion, comparable in size to the island of Oahu.

Flora and fauna

Beezley Hills Preserve lies in or adjacent to the Channeled Scablands desert; northern Grant County receives  of rain annually. The preserve contains many arid climate species.

Cacti
Flora in the Beezley Hills include Pediocactus simpsonii (hedgehog cactus) and Opuntia polyacantha (prickly pear). The latter was called "quite rare" in Washington by one author, who noted it was listed as nonexistent in the state by many authorities.

Pygmy rabbit
The Columbia Basin pygmy rabbit, listed as an endangered species in the United States, is endemic to the Columbia Basin. An active conservation and endangered species recovery program is under way with participation from the United States Fish and Wildlife Service (FWS), the Washington State Department of Fish and Wildlife and The Nature Conservancy, with the Beezley Hills designated a "recovery emphasis area" by FWS.

Notes

References

Further reading

External links

Moses Coulee/Beezley Hills Preserve at The Nature Conservancy
trails.com topographic map

Landforms of Grant County, Washington
Ridges of Washington (state)